The Kola Norwegians are Norwegian people, who mostly settled along the coastline of the Kola Peninsula in Russia.

History
In 1860 the Russian Tsar Alexander II granted permission for Norwegian settlements on the Kola. Around 1870, scores of families from Finnmark in northern Norway departed for the Murman Coast, attracted by the prospects of fishing and trade. The Russian authorities granted them privileges to trade with Norway.

Most of them settled in Tsyp-Navolok on the easternmost tip of the Rybachiy Peninsula (– both terms meaning "Fishermen's Peninsula"). Others settled in Vayda-Guba at the northwestern tip – Cape Nemetskiy ("Cape German") – of the same peninsula. A vibrant society developed while retaining contact with Norway, especially with the town of Vardø. Some settlers returned to Norway shortly after the Russian Revolution of 1917, but most of them remained at Tsyp-Navolok. In 1917 perhaps about 1000 lived on the Kola.

On 23 June 1940, Lavrenty Beria of the NKVD ordered the Murmansk Oblast, encompassing the entire Kola Peninsula, to be cleaned of "foreign nationals". As a result, the entire Norwegian population was deported for resettlement in the Karelo-Finnish SSR. Soon they had to move from there too, because of pressures caused by the Finnish invasion of the Soviet Union in 1941. In spring 1942, a large proportion died of starvation and malnutrition.

Despite many having served in the Red Army, they were not allowed to return home to the Kola after the end of the Second World War. Many children were raised without learning to speak Norwegian.

Recent history
After 1992, some descendants of the original settlers began to emphasize their family backgrounds, although only a few had been able to maintain a rusty knowledge of the Vardø dialect of the Norwegian language. Some have now migrated to Norway. There are special provisions in Norwegian immigration law which ease this process, albeit generally being less permissive than those which pertain in other countries which operate a "right of return". In order to obtain a permit to move to Norway and work there, a foreign citizen must show an adequate connection to the country, such as having two or more grandparents who were born there. As for citizenship, it is awarded on the same basis as to anyone else. By 2004, approximately 200 Kola Norwegians had settled in Norway.

Only 98 individuals identified themselves as Norwegians in the 2010 census of Russia, including 20 in St. Petersburg, 11 in Murmansk, and 4 in Karelia.

See also
Population transfer in the Soviet Union
Russenorsk, an extinct Russo-Norwegian pidgin 
Pomors, coastal Russian settlers
Bjarmaland
Murmansk Finns

References

Ethnic groups in Russia
Ethnic groups in Sápmi
Political repression in the Soviet Union
Forced migration in the Soviet Union
Norway–Soviet Union relations
Social history of Norway
Murmansk Oblast
White Sea
Norway–Russia relations
Russian people of Norwegian descent
Norwegian diaspora in Europe
Barents Sea
European diaspora in Russia
Historical ethnic groups of Russia
History of Finnmark
History of Murmansk Oblast
History of the Arctic